In enzymology, an isoflavone 7-O-methyltransferase is an enzyme that catalyzes the chemical reaction

S-adenosyl-L-methionine + a 7-hydroxyisoflavone  S-adenosyl-L-homocysteine + a 7-methoxyisoflavone

Thus, the two substrates of this enzyme are S-adenosyl methionine and 7-hydroxyisoflavone, whereas its two products are S-adenosylhomocysteine and 7-methoxyisoflavone.

This enzyme belongs to the family of transferases, specifically those transferring one-carbon group methyltransferases.  The systematic name of this enzyme class is S-adenosyl-L-methionine:hydroxyisoflavone 7-O-methyltransferase. This enzyme participates in isoflavonoid biosynthesis.

References 

 
 
 
 
 
 
 

EC 2.1.1
Enzymes of unknown structure
Isoflavonoids metabolism
O-methylated flavonoids metabolism